The 2017 Asian Women's Junior Handball Championship was the 14th edition of the championship organised by the Handball Association of Hong Kong China under the auspices of the Asian Handball Federation. It was held in Tsim Sha Tsui, Hong Kong from 15 to 23 July 2017. It was played in under-19 years category. It was the first time that Hong Kong staged the competition. It also acts as qualification tournament for the IHF Women's Junior World Handball Championship. Top three teams i.e. South Korea, China and Japan qualified for the 2018 Women's Junior World Handball Championship to be held in Hungary.

Participating Teams
  (Host)
  (Defending Champion)

Round-robin

Match results

Final standings

External links
www.asianhandball.org

International handball competitions hosted by Hong Kong
2017 Asian Women's Junior Handball Championship
2017 Asian Women's Junior Handball Championship
Asia
Asian Handball Championships